Paulusma is a surname. Notable people with the surname include: 

Polly Paulusma (born 1976), English singer-songwriter
Wieke Paulusma (born 1978), Dutch politician